Rosalind Ayres (born 7 December 1946) is an English actress, director and producer.  Active since 1970, Ayres is well known for her role in the 1997 film Titanic, in which she played Lucy, Lady Duff-Gordon. Her husband, Martin Jarvis, played Sir Cosmo Duff-Gordon in the film.

Biography
Ayres has appeared in numerous films and television series, including regular performances in Armchair Thriller, Penmarric, Play for Today, The Bounder, Father's Day and Trevor's World of Sport. She has acted in and directed numerous audio plays for L.A. Theatre Works and Hollywood Theater of the Ear.

Ayres appeared on the BBC One semi-improvised sitcom Outnumbered as Gran in series 3 (2010) for the episodes "The Family Outing" and "The Internet". She returned as Gran in the first episode of series four (2011) named "The Funeral". Ayres also appeared in the Christmas special in 2012.

In addition to her film and television work, in 2011, Ayres provided voice and motion capture work for Katherine Marlowe, the main antagonist of the video game Uncharted 3: Drake's Deception, opposite Nolan North, Richard McGonagle and Graham McTavish. Together with her husband, Ayres runs the radio production company "Jarvis & Ayres Productions", producing and directing plays and serials for BBC Radio 4.

Ayres also played the character of Iris in the comedy sitcom Kate and Koji as a customer in the café who regularly consulted the doctor on various ailments. It aired in April 2020 and she appeared in three episodes. In September 2022, Ayres appeared alongside her husband in an episode of the BBC soap opera Doctors as Ellie Chilton.

TV and filmography

References

External links

Actor's Compendium

1946 births
Living people
Alumni of Loughborough University
English film actresses
English stage actresses
English television actresses
English voice actresses
English video game actresses
Actresses from Birmingham, West Midlands